Hernani Manuel Conceição Brôco (born 13 June 1981 in Torres Vedras) is a Portuguese former road cyclist.

Major results

2001
 1st Stage 1 GP CTT Correios de Portugal
2002
 3rd Time trial, National Under-23 Road Championships
2003
 1st  Time trial, National Under-23 Road Championships
2004
 1st  Mountains classification Vuelta a Castilla y León
 5th Overall Volta ao Alentejo
2005
 3rd Time trial, National Road Championships
2010
 3rd Time trial, National Road Championships
 5th Overall Volta a Portugal
 6th Overall Troféu Joaquim Agostinho
2011
 3rd Time trial, National Road Championships
 4th Overall Vuelta a Asturias
 5th Overall Volta a Portugal
1st Stage 3
 9th Overall Troféu Joaquim Agostinho
2013
 5th Overall Volta a Portugal
 10th Overall Troféu Joaquim Agostinho
2014
 7th Overall Troféu Joaquim Agostinho
2015
 2nd Overall GP Internacional do Guadiana
 7th Overall Troféu Joaquim Agostinho
 9th Overall Volta a Portugal
2016
 2nd Overall Troféu Joaquim Agostinho

References

External links

1981 births
Living people
People from Torres Vedras
Portuguese male cyclists
Sportspeople from Lisbon District